Karen Gulley is an Australian former professional tennis player.

Gulley, an Australian hardcourt junior champion, played on the international tour in the early 1980s, featuring in main draws at the French Open and Wimbledon. She made the singles second round of the 1980 Australian Open, beating Marcie Harper. In 1981 she and Dale Collings reached the round of 16 in mixed doubles at Wimbledon.

References

External links
 
 

Year of birth missing (living people)
Living people
Australian female tennis players